The Weaver Hotel was built in 1905-06 in Waterville, Kansas. The only three-story building in Waterville, it was built by William E. Weaver for his parents. The hotel has operated more or less continuously ever since.

The hotel is located at the corner of Kansas and Front Streets. The stone-textured blocks have been painted white. The flat roof is concealed by a parapet, with a painted wood parapet at the corner. A wood porch extends along the south side, around the rounded corner of the building and halfway down the east side. Restaurant space originally occupied the ground floor, with guest rooms on the upper levels.

The Weaver Hotel was listed on the National Register of Historic Places on August 28, 1975.

References

External links
Weaver Hotel website

Hotel buildings on the National Register of Historic Places in Kansas
Renaissance Revival architecture in Kansas
Hotel buildings completed in 1905
Buildings and structures in Marshall County, Kansas
Hotels in Kansas
Historic American Buildings Survey in Kansas
National Register of Historic Places in Marshall County, Kansas
1905 establishments in Kansas